Regional elections were held in Denmark on 2 March 1954. 11505 municipal council members were elected, as well as 299 members of the amts of Denmark.

Results of regional elections
The results of the regional elections:

Amt Councils

Municipal Councils

References

1954
Denmark
Elections